Robozuna is a British CGI-animated science fiction children's television series on CITV and Netflix starring Taylor Clarke-Hill, Tom Clarke-Hill and Luke Howard. The premise revolves around a planet seized by an evil empire and its legion of robots. The orphan boy Ariston (Taylor Clarke-Hill) and his homemade robot friend Mangle (Tom Clarke-Hill) try to free their planet.

Cast
 Taylor Clarke-Hill as Ariston
 Tom Clarke-Hill as Mangle
 Luke Howard as Drubber
 Ali-A as Clunk
 Danny John-Jules as Niven and Spark
 Morwenna Banks as Danuvia
as Clubber

Episodes

Home media
In UK, ITV Studios Global Entertainment will publish the series soon on DVD.

References

External links
 
 

2018 British television series debuts
2019 British television series endings
2010s British animated television series
British children's animated science fiction television series
English-language Netflix original programming
ITV children's television shows
Animated television series about robots
Animated television series by Netflix
Television series by ITV Studios
Television series set in fictional countries